Saint-Sauveur is a commune in the Isère department in southeastern France.

Population

Transport
There is a train station in the nearby town of Saint-Marcellin

See also
Communes of the Isère department

References

Communes of Isère
Isère communes articles needing translation from French Wikipedia